Třebešov is a municipality and village in Rychnov nad Kněžnou District in the Hradec Králové Region of the Czech Republic. It has about 300 inhabitants.

References

Villages in Rychnov nad Kněžnou District